ICPM is an acronym that may refer to:

Institute of Certified Professional Managers
Illinois College of Podiatric Medicine